Cristian Damián Leyes (born January 14, 1986) is an Argentine football defender who plays for Guaraní Antonio Franco in the Primera B Nacional, on loan from Quilmes.

Career
Leyes began his playing career with Tigre in 2008. He made his league debut in a 2-1 away win against Colón on 1 March 2008. After playing more than 50 league games with Tigre, Leyes transferred to Quilmes on a free transfer in July 2010, signing a 3-year deal.

References

External links
 ESPN statistics 
 Argentine Primera statistics at Fútbol XXI 

1986 births
Living people
People from San Luis Province
Argentine footballers
Association football defenders
Argentine Primera División players
Club Atlético Tigre footballers
Quilmes Atlético Club footballers